Jorge Luis Rodriguez is an American educator, painter, sculptor and mixed-media artist. Born in Puerto Rico, Rodriguez came to New York City when he was 19 years old, to live with his father and brother, hoping to expand his technical training with a more experimental style. Rodriguez worked as a Junior Art Director before attending School of Visual Arts and New York University getting his Bachelor Degree and Masters in Fine Arts respectively.

Rodriguez's work and style evolved over the years, spanning from op-art to abstraction and from two dimensional works to three dimensional sculptures and installations. The NYC Department of Cultural Affairs under Mayor Koch developed a Percent for Art Program in 1982. Rodriguez was the first artist to be selected by the agency with his sculpture Growth.

References 

Living people
Puerto Rican artists
American artists
Year of birth missing (living people)